Burg Greifenstein is a castle in Lower Austria, Austria, overlooking the Danube. Approximately opposite to Burg Greifenstein is Burg Kreuzenstein, on the north shore of the Danube.

History

Early
The castle is thought to be built around the 11th Century, and was first mentioned in 1135. However, the owners of the castle changed owners frequently during its service from the 11th century to 1918. It began life playing a significant role in the defense system along the Danube.

More recently, in the 16th century, the castle served primarily as a notorious prison of the ecclesiastical court. Throughout history, the castle was repeatedly invaded and damaged, but repaired, again and again. It was inhabited until about 1770, when it was abandoned and fell into disrepair. Until 1803, it belonged to the Bishops of Passau.

Johann I von Liechtenstein refurbished it in 1807–08 in the Romantic style but at the end of the 19th century, the castle fell again and was sold in 1918, coming into private ownership.

Recent
A conflagration in the castle on 16 September 2006 rendered the castle inaccessible. The castle has remained in private ownership and is presumed to be on sale.

See also
List of castles in Austria

References

This article was initially translated from the German Wikipedia.

Castles in Lower Austria